Norman Frederick Evennett (29 June 1929 – 12 June 1970) was a Papua New Guinean politician. He served as a member of the House of Assembly from 1968 until his death two years later.

Biography
Evennett was born in Samarai in the Territory of Papua in 1929.  He attended Townsville State School and All Souls School in Charters Towers, before returning to Papua, where he became a businessman and plantation owner.

In the 1968 general elections, Evennett contested the Esa'ala Open constituency under the Tok Pisin name "Nomani". He was elected to the House of Assembly on the first count after receiving more than half of all votes cast.

He died in Samarai hospital in June 1970, survived by his wife and children.

References

1929 births
20th-century Papua New Guinean businesspeople
Papua New Guinean farmers
Members of the House of Assembly of Papua and New Guinea
1970 deaths